Roberto Antonio Brunetto (born November 7, 1955 in Santa Fe) is a former Argentine football defender who played at club level for Instituto de Córdoba . He also played in Bolivian first division for clubs such as, Oriente Petrolero, The Strongest and Real Santa Cruz.

Club title

See also
Football in Argentina
List of football clubs in Argentina

References

External links
 Roberto Brunetto at BDFA.com.ar 

1955 births
Living people
Footballers from Santa Fe, Argentina
Association football defenders
Argentine footballers
Instituto footballers
Oriente Petrolero players
The Strongest players
Expatriate footballers in Bolivia